The 1999–2000 United Hockey League season was the ninth season of the United Hockey League (Colonial Hockey League before 1997), a North American minor professional league. 14 teams participated in the regular season and the Flint Generals won the league title.

Offseason
The Fort Wayne Komets joined the league as an expansion team after departing from the IHL.

The Thunder Bay Thunder Cats were bought by United Sports Ventures and relocated the team to Rockford to become the Rockford IceHogs

The Madison Monsters relocated to Knoxville to become the Knoxville Speed

The Winston-Salem Icehawks relocated to Glens Falls to become the Adirondack Icehawks.

The Saginaw Gears relocated to Massillon, Ohio midseason after opting out of their lease with Wendler Arena

Regular season

Colonial Cup-Playoffs

External links
 Season 1999/2000 on hockeydb.com

United Hockey League seasons
UHL
UHL